Lucius Tarquinius may refer to:
Lucius Tarquinius Collatinus
Lucius Tarquinius Superbus
Lucius Tarquinius Priscus